Wanda R. D. Williams (born 1953) is an American Democratic politician from Harrisburg, Pennsylvania currently serving as 39th Mayor of Harrisburg. Running as a Democrat and President of the Harrisburg City Council, she won the 2021 Harrisburg mayoral election becoming the city's second female and second African-American mayor.

Early life
Williams grew up in Harrisburg and attended William Penn High and Harrisburg Area Community College.

Politics
Williams started her political career in 1998 as a member of the Harrisburg school board. She served on the Harrisburg City Council since 2006, with her last two terms serving as the council president. During her time in the City Council, she worked to set term limits for Harrisburg mayors. In 2016 she received criticism as she was accused of politicizing the Harrisburg Environmental Advisory Council.

Although she had originally planned to run again for city council, Williams announced her candidacy for mayor of Harrisburg in March 2021, running on a platform of infrastructure improvements, affordable housing, and revitalization. She won the Democratic primary for the 2021 Harrisburg mayoral election in an upset with 28.95% of the vote, leading incumbent mayor Eric Papenfuse's 27.93% by only 56 votes, to become the Democratic nominee. She was seen as the heavy favorite to win in the general election, as the winner of the Harrisburg Democratic primary has gone on to win the mayorship since 1977. She faced a single Republican candidate who is facing criminal charges of child abuse. However, on September 15, Eric Papenfuse announced that he would run a write-in campaign in the November General Election. Despite this, Williams won the general election by more than a 2–1 margin. Williams became the city's second Black and second female mayor. On July 31, 2022 Williams transferred mayoral powers to Police Commissioner Thomas Carter due to a medical procedure; Carter served as acting mayor until August 16, 2022.

Personal life
Williams lost a granddaughter to gun violence in 2013 as a bystander at a shooting.

References

1953 births
21st-century African-American women
21st-century African-American politicians
21st-century American politicians
21st-century American women politicians
Harrisburg City Council members
Living people
Mayors of Harrisburg, Pennsylvania
Pennsylvania Democrats
Women political candidates
African-American people in Pennsylvania politics
African-American mayors in Pennsylvania
Women mayors of places in Pennsylvania
Women city councillors in Pennsylvania
African-American women mayors